Tuppy Ngintja Goodwin (born 1952) is an Aboriginal Australian artist from South Australia. She is a painter, and director of Mimili Maku Arts.

Early life
Goodwin is a Pitjantjatjara woman from Mimili in the Anangu Pitjantjatjara Yankunytjatjara Lands in the remote north-west of South Australia. She was born in Bumbali Creek (her father's Country) and she came to Mimili as a baby, when it was still a cattle station called Everard Park. A number of her siblings are also artists, including Robin Kankapankatja and Margaret Dodd.

Career
Goodwin spent much of her life working at the Mimili Anangu School as a pre-school teacher and retired in 2009.

Art practice
Goodwin is a painter working with Mimili Maku Arts where she is a director and, through her work and dance, is committed to fostering traditional law and culture.

She has been painting with Mimili Maku Arts since 2010 and, like many others at the centre, paints her Tjukurrpa (Dreaming). Her work has a particular focus on Antara, a sacred rockhole at Bumbali Creek and a site where the women of the area perform inmaku pakani; a dance ceremony where the women would paint their bodies in red ochre. Goodwin also paints Tjala (Honey Ant) Dreaming

Goodwin's paintings have a distinct style that has resulted in great success, with fluid brushstrokes overlaying solid masses of colour that bring texture to the canvas.

Recognition
She was a finalist in the 2010 Telstra Aboriginal and Torres Strait Art Awards held in Darwin, Northern Territory.

In 2020 her acrylic painting painting on linen, Antara (2018), was a finalist in the John Leslie Art Prize at Gippsland Art Gallery in Sale, Victoria.

Collections
Goodwin's  work is held in many important collections including: Art Gallery of New South Wales, Museum and Art Gallery of the Northern Territory, National Gallery of Australia, National Gallery of Victoria and the Art Gallery of New South Wales.

Personal life
Goodwin's late husband was Kunmanara (Mumu Mike) Williams (1952–2019).

References 

Artists from South Australia
Australian Aboriginal artists
Australian women artists
1950s births
Living people